Flexor hallucis brevis muscle is a muscle of the foot that flexes the big toe.

Structure

Flexor hallucis brevis muscle arises, by a pointed tendinous process, from the medial part of the under surface of the cuboid bone, from the contiguous portion of the third cuneiform, and from the prolongation of the tendon of the tibialis posterior muscle which is attached to that bone. It divides in front into two portions, which are inserted into the medial and lateral sides of the base of the first phalanx of the great toe, a sesamoid bone being present in each tendon at its insertion. The medial portion is blended with the abductor hallucis muscle previous to its insertion; the lateral portion (sometimes described as the first plantar interosseus) with the adductor hallucis muscle. The tendon of the flexor hallucis longus muscle lies in a groove between the two. Its tendon usually contains two sesamoid bones at the point under the first metatarsophalangeal joint.

Innervation
The medial and lateral head of the flexor hallucis brevis is innervated by the medial plantar nerve. Both heads are represented by spinal segments S1, S2.

Variation
Origin subject to considerable variation; it often receives fibers from the calcaneus or long plantar ligament. Attachment to the cuboid bone sometimes wanting. Slip to first phalanx of the second toe.

Function

Flexor hallucis brevis flexes the first metatarsophalangeal joint, or the big toe. It helps to maintain the medial longitudinal arch. It assists with the toe-off phase of gait providing increased push-off.

Clinical significance 
Sesamoid bones contained within the tendon of flexor hallucis brevis muscle may become damaged during exercise.

Additional images

References

External links
 PTCentral

Foot muscles
Muscles of the lower limb